Reut may refer to one of the following.

Reut is a municipality in the district of Rottal-Inn in Bavaria in Germany
Răut River, Moldova
Reut Institute, a policy group, Israel
Reut. is a taxonomic abbreviation for the botanist George François Reuter